Gerhard Grimmer (born 6 April 1943 in Hora Svaté Kateřiny) is known as an East German cross-country skier who competed during the 1960s and 1970s. He won several medals at the FIS Nordic World Ski Championships, including golds in the 50 km and the 4 × 10 km relay (both in 1974); silvers in the 30 km (1970), 4 × 10 km relay (1970), and 15 km (1974); and a bronze in the 50 km (1970). Grimmer also won the Holmenkollen ski festival at 50 km twice (1970–71). He competed at three Olympics (1968, 1972, and 1976) and his best Olympic finish was fifth at the 1976 Winter Olympics in Innsbruck in the 50 km.

In 1975, he was awarded the Holmenkollen medal (shared with Oddvar Brå and Ivar Formo).

Cross-country skiing results
All results are sourced from the International Ski Federation (FIS).

Olympic Games

World Championships
 6 medals – (2 gold, 3 silver, 1 bronze)

References

 
  – click Holmenkollmedaljen for downloadable pdf file 
  – click Vinnere for downloadable pdf file 

1943 births
People from Most District
Sudeten German people
Cross-country skiers at the 1976 Winter Olympics
German male cross-country skiers
Holmenkollen medalists
Holmenkollen Ski Festival winners
Living people
Olympic cross-country skiers of East Germany
National People's Army military athletes
FIS Nordic World Ski Championships medalists in cross-country skiing
Cross-country skiers at the 1972 Winter Olympics
Cross-country skiers at the 1968 Winter Olympics